Sharon Petzold  (born 10 October 1971) is an American freestyle skier.

She competed at the FIS Freestyle World Ski Championships 1991 in Lake Placid, where she placed fifteenth in acroski (ski ballet). She won a silver medal in ski ballet at the FIS Freestyle World Ski Championships 1993 in Altenmarkt-Zauchensee.

She took part at the 1992 Winter Olympics in Albertville, where ski ballet was a demonstration event.

References

External links 
 

1971 births
Living people
American female freestyle skiers
21st-century American women